The Trials of Cate McCall is a 2013 American drama film directed and written by Karen Moncrieff and stars Kate Beckinsale, Nick Nolte and Clancy Brown in pivotal roles.

Plot 
Cate McCall (Kate Beckinsale) is a lawyer, an alcoholic in recovery and on probation, and estranged from her family. In order to regain custody of her young daughter and be reinstated to the bar, she accepts the pro bono appeal of a woman, Lacey, who has been convicted of murder. Aided by her assistant, Cate pulls out all stops to prove Lacey's innocence, as well as work on her own alcohol and work addictions. Cate becomes obsessed with the case, neglecting arranged time with her daughter while she successfully gets Lacey's conviction overturned. When Cate finds out that Lacey is guilty, she starts drinking again, causing her to further neglect her daughter. Cate returns to her old job at a high-profile law firm, and purposefully torpedoes her own client's case in the middle of a trial. Cate then takes multiple illegal actions to put Lacey back in prison. Cate gives evidence to the prosecutor who can convict Lacey, then conspires with the prosecutor; the two of them agree to keep it a secret so that she won't be disbarred, which would deny him the ability to use the evidence that he should not have. Cate does not recuse herself from Lacey's trial – though she does blackmail the original judge, who previously ruled in Lacey's favour, to recuse himself. The prosecutor, exercising prosecutorial misconduct, does not recuse himself from the case either. Cate's overt acts of fraud, conspiracy, blackmail and misconduct enable her to get Lacey re-convicted. Cate's reward for her illegal actions is to be granted shared custody of her daughter.

Cast 
 Kate Beckinsale as Cate McCall
 Nick Nolte as Bridges
 Clancy Brown as Randall Brinkerhoff
 David Lyons as Josh
Ava Kolker as Augie
 Mark Pellegrino as Detective Robert Welch
 James Cromwell as Justice Jamison Sumpter
 Isaiah Washington as Wilson George
 Brad Greenquist as Dr. Ennis 
 Anna Anissimova as Lacey
 Jim Klock as Bailiff Powell
 Jay Thomas as Loncraine. This was Thomas's final film appearance before his death in 2017.

Production 
The filming of The Trials of Cate McCall began on May 16, 2012, in Los Angeles.

Release

Distribution
The 2012 production was not released in the United States until 2014.  In June 2012 Sierra/Affinity acquired the international distribution rights to the film.

Box office
The Trials of Cate McCall performed poorly, showing total box office revenue, from foreign markets, of less than $250,000.

References

External links 
 
 
 The Trials of Cate McCall at the Turner Classic Movies

2013 films
Films shot in Los Angeles
2010s legal drama films
American legal drama films
Films directed by Karen Moncrieff
Films about alcoholism
2013 drama films
2010s English-language films
2010s American films